Women's Slalom World Cup 1985/1986

Final point standings

In Women's Slalom World Cup 1985/86 the best 5 results count.

Women's Slalom Team Results

All points were shown including individuel deduction. bold indicate highest score - italics indicate race wins

References
 fis-ski.com

World Cup
FIS Alpine Ski World Cup slalom women's discipline titles